Pyromorphite is a mineral species composed of lead chlorophosphate: Pb5(PO4)3Cl, sometimes occurring in sufficient abundance to be mined as an ore of lead. Crystals are common, and have the form of a hexagonal prism terminated by the basal planes, sometimes combined with narrow faces of a hexagonal pyramid. Crystals with a barrel-like curvature are not uncommon. Globular and reniform masses are also found. It is part of a series with two other minerals: mimetite (Pb5(AsO4)3Cl) and vanadinite (Pb5(VO4)3Cl), the resemblance in external characters is so close that, as a rule, it is only possible to distinguish between them by chemical tests. They were formerly confused under the names green lead ore and brown lead ore (German: Grünbleierz and Braunbleierz). 

The phosphate was first distinguished chemically by M. H. Klaproth in 1784,<ref>{{cite web | url = http://tw.strahlen.org/typloc/pyromorphit.html | title= Entdeckung von Pyromorphit (Discovery of pyromorphite) | author = Dr. Thomas Witzke | language = de}}</ref> and it was named pyromorphite by J. F. L. Hausmann in 1813. The name is derived from the Greek for pyr (fire) and morfe (form) due to its crystallization behavior after being melted. Paecilomyces javanicus is a mold collected from a lead-polluted soil that is able to form biominerals of pyromorphite.

Properties and isomorphism
The color of the mineral is usually some bright shade of green, yellow or brown, and the luster is resinous. The hardness is 3.5 to 4, and the specific gravity 6.5 - 7.1. Owing to isomorphous replacement of the phosphorus by arsenic there may be a gradual passage from pyromorphite to mimetite. Varieties containing calcium isomorphously replacing lead are lower in density (specific gravity 5.9 - 6.5) and usually lighter in color; they bear the names polysphaerite (because of the globular form), miesite from Stříbro (pronounced Mies'' in German) in Bohemia, nussierite from Nuizière, Chénelette, near Beaujeu, Rhône, France, and cherokine from Cherokee County in Georgia.

Gallery

See also 
 List of minerals

References

External links

Lead minerals
Phosphate minerals
Halide minerals
Hexagonal minerals
Minerals in space group 176
Luminescent minerals